A Seven and Seven or 7 and 7 is a highball cocktail, a mixed alcoholic drink containing Seagram's Seven Crown, a blended whiskey, and 7 Up, a lemon-lime soft drink. It is typically served with ice.  It was one of the most popular drinks in the United States during the 1970s.

Mixture
The following is a typical recipe for a 7 and 7:
Fill a highball glass with ice cubes.
Add 1 shot (about 1.5 US fl oz or 45 ml) Seagram's Seven Crown whisky.
Add  7 Up, to taste.
Garnish with lemon or lime wedge (optional).

See also
 List of cocktails
 List of IBA official cocktails

References

Bubbly cocktails
Cocktails with lemon-lime soda
Cocktails with whisky